The 2008-09 Biathlon World Cup/Sprint Women will start at Saturday December 6, 2008 in Östersund and will finish Thursday March 26, 2009 in Khanty-Mansiysk. Defending titlist is Magdalena Neuner of Germany.

Competition format
The  sprint race is the third oldest biathlon event; the distance is skied over three laps. The biathlete shoots two times at any shooting lane, first prone, then standing, totalling 10 targets. For each missed target the biathlete has to complete a penalty lap of around 150 metres. Competitors' starts are staggered, normally by 30 seconds.

2007-08 Top 3 Standings

Medal winners

Final standings

References

Biathlon World Cup - Sprint Women, 2008-09